Huron High School is a high school located in Huron, South Dakota. Their athletics teams are known as the Huron Tigers.

Notable pupils
Harold Van Heuvelen, musician
Lynn Schneider, member of the South Dakota House of Representatives
Jennifer Hart, murderer

References

Public high schools in South Dakota